The Sanford Spinners are a minor league baseball team based in Sanford, North Carolina. The  Spinners played as members of the Class D level Bi-State League in 1941 and 1942, Tobacco State League from 1946 to 1950, winning league championships in 1942 and 1946, and Old North State League from 2021 to Present. The Spinners hosted minor league home games at Temple Park.

History
The Sanford Spinners began minor league play in 1941. The Spinners became members of the six–team 1941 Class D level Bi-State League. The Danville-Schoolfield Leafs, Leaksville-Draper-Spray Triplets, Martinsville Manufacturers, Mayodan Millers and Mt. Airy Graniteers joined Sanford in league play.

The Sanford use of the "Spinners" moniker corresponds to local industry in the era. Beginning in 1915, Sanford was home to the Seaboard Milling Company.

In their first season of play, the Sanford Spinners won the Bi-State League championship. Sanford finished their first season with a regular season record of 58–54, placing 4th in the six–team Bi-State League standings, playing under manager Zeb Harrington. Sanford finished 7.0 games behind the 1st place Leaksville-Draper-Spray Triplets in the final standings. In the playoffs, Stanford won 4 games to 3 over the Martinsville Manufacturers. In the Finals Sanford defeated the Danville-Schoolfield Leafs 4 games to 2 to win the championship. Sanford pitcher, Dave Odom led the Bi-State League with 16 wins and 190 strikeouts.

The Sanford Spinners continued play in the 1942 Bi-State League, reaching the finals of the eight–team league. With a record of 62–59, Sanford placed 2nd in the standings, finishing 6.5 games behind the 1st place Wilson Tobos, playing under manager Frank Rogers. In the 1st round of the playoffs, Sanford defeated the Burlington Bees 4 games to 1 to advance. In the finals, the Rocky Mount Rocks defeated Sanford 4 games to 1. The Bi–State permanently folded following the 1942 season, with the onset of World War II.

The 1946 Sanford Spinners resumed play and won the league pennant joining a new league. Sanford became charter members of the six–team Class D level Tobacco State League. The Angier-Fuquay Springs Bulls, Clinton Blues, Dunn-Erwin Twins, Smithfield-Selma Leafs and Wilmington Pirates joined Sanford in league play.

The Spinners finished the 1946 Tobacco State League regular season with a 71–48 record to place 1st, finishing 0.5 game ahead of the 2nd place Clinton Blues. Playing under managers Gaither Riley and Zeb Harrington, Sanford lost in the first round of the Tobacco State League playoffs as Angier-Fuquay defeated Sanford 4 games to 2. Orville Nesselrode of Sanford led the Tobacco State League with 30 home runs and 150 RBI. Pitcher George Bortz led the league with 193 strikeouts.

In 1947, it was reported that L.D. Isenhour, Jr. was president of the Sanford Spinners, with Sam Allen serving as business manager for the franchise.

The 1947 Sanford Spinners were Tobacco State League champions. Playing in the eight–team league, Sanford ended the regular season in 1st place with a 86–39 record under Zeb Harrington, who would manage the team for the remainder of its existence. Sanford finished 12.5 games ahead of the 2nd place Lumberton Cubs. In the playoffs, Sanford first defeated the Wilmington Pirates 4 games to 2. The Spinners won the championship by defeating Lumberton 4 games 3 in the finals. Sanford's John McFadden led the league with a 15–5 record and 2.44 ERA. Jimmy Wilson of Sanford, led the league in batting average, hitting .385 and Orville Nesselrode again led the Tobacco State League with 32 home runs and 166 RBI.

In 1948, the Sanford Spinners won the Tobacco State League pennant and advanced to the league finals. With an 80–56 record under manager Zeb Harrington, Sanford finished 5.0 games ahead of the 2nd place Wilmington Pirates. In the 1st round of the playoffs, Sanford defeated the Smithfield-Selma Leafs 4 games to 1. In the finals, the Red Springs Red Robins defeated Sanford 4 games to 1. Orville Nesselrode again led the league with 27 home runs and 159 RBI, while hitting .368. Jimmy Wilson of Sanford led the league with 145 runs and 212 hits.

Orville Nesselrode had reportedly suffered frostbite in World War II and wasn't considered a major league prospect. Following his playing career, Nesselrode settled in Sanford, North Carolina, opening a service station in 1954. “Hank’s,” service station was located at the corner of Endor (Horner) and Carthage Street in downtown Sanford.

Continuing play in the 1949 Tobacco State League, the Spinners placed 4th. The Spinners finished the regular season with a record of 71–62 under manager Zeb Harrington and finished 9.0 games behind the 1st place Dunn-Erwin Twins. Sanford lost in the 1st round playoff series against the Red Springs Red Robins 4 games to 2.
 
In their final season, the 1950 Sanford Spinners advanced to the Tobacco State League finals. With a 90–44 record, the Spinners placed 2nd in the regular season standings, finishing 1.5 games behind 1st place Lumberton Auctioneers. Led by manager Zeb Harrington, Sanford swept the Red Springs Red Robins in four games. In the finals, the Rockingham Eagles defeated Stanford 4 games to 3. Hoyt Clegg of Sanford led the league with 24 wins. The Tobacco State League permanently folded following the 1950 season.

The Sanford Spinners came back on April 6, 2021, and Hosted their first game at Tramway part on July 7, 2021 against the Fayetteville Chutes.

The ballpark
The Sanford Spinners teams were noted to have played minor league teams home games at Temple Park. The original ballpark has been torn down and was built as a Works Project Administration project in the 1930s. It was located at McIver Street and Bragg Street, Sanford, North Carolina. Today, Temple Park is still in use as a public park with ballparks.

Timeline

Year-by-year records

Notable alumni

Julián Acosta (1942)
Dave Odom (1941, 1946)
Joe Prater (1942)
Neb Stewart (1941)

See also
Sanford Spinners players

References

External links
 Baseball ReferenceTeam history/photos

Defunct minor league baseball teams
Professional baseball teams in North Carolina
Defunct baseball teams in North Carolina
Baseball teams established in 1941
Baseball teams disestablished in 1950
Bi-State League teams
Tobacco State League teams